Coryphaenoides brevibarbis, also called the shortbeard grenadier, is a species of deep-sea fish in the family Macrouridae.

Description

Coryphaenoides brevibarbis is pale brown in colour, with the lips, lining of gill cavities and peritoneum black. Its premaxillary teeth are in a narrow/broad band, while the lower jaw has one row of teeth. Its snout is low and blunt, barely protruding, hence the name brevibarbis ("short beard").

Habitat

Behaviour
Coryphaenoides brevibarbis feeds on crustaceans, mysids and worms, using olfaction and its lateral line to find prey. Lifespan is about 14–15 years. Cyclocotyloides bergstadi and Chondracanthodes deflexus are parasites living in its gills. Many nematode parasites are also found in it.

References

Macrouridae
Fish described in 1899
Taxa named by George Brown Goode
Taxa named by Tarleton Hoffman Bean